Hunky Dory is a British independent musical film about the trials of an idealistic drama teacher as she tries to put on the end-of-year show. It was written by Laurence Coriat and directed by Welsh director Marc Evans and stars Minnie Driver, Aneurin Barnard, Kimberley Nixon and Robert Pugh. It premièred at the 55th BFI London Film Festival on 25 October 2011, and was officially released on 2 March 2012 in the UK.

Plot
Set in a Welsh comprehensive school during the long hot summer of 1976, keen drama teacher Vivienne (Minnie Driver) fights sweltering heat and general teenage apathy to put on a glam rock musical version of Shakespeare's The Tempest of which David Bowie (whose album provides the name of the film) might be proud. To engage her totally lackadaisical students, and get them to explore and express their emotions, she uses pop hits of the time, performed by a fresh young cast led by Davey (Aneurin Barnard). She hopes her more liberal approach to learning may stir them to discover they might be good at something, if once they let their inhibitions go, and might actually have fun creating something, and even absorb some of the dreaded Shakespeare after all. Her aspirations appear thwarted by her troublesome students who, raging with hormones, get up to various antics which seem destined to sabotage the musical. She also faces opposition from traditionally-minded, old-fashioned teaching staff, so getting the show to opening night is a constant challenge.

Later, a frustrated student sets fire to the whole school auditorium. Consequently, now minus a stage and most of the musical instruments, the show has to be promptly cancelled by the headmaster, despite his cooperation having earlier been bribed by his being cast in the part of Prospero). A side plot involves conflict between Vivienne's liberalism and the attitudes of her long-standing opponents on the staff, centring on discovering which "delinquent" student was responsible for the arson. Deflated, but ultimately unwilling to chart this mishap or her role as "music teacher" as yet another thing she's failed at in life, she manages to persuade both the headmaster and the students to continue with rehearsals, and go ahead with the show regardless, but re-siting it in an alfresco outdoor setting. So The Tempest is staged under moon and stars, set around a large theatrical looking tree on the school grounds. Her production is a triumph, much enjoyed by both the students and their families in the audience.

An end scene, just prior to the credits rolling, features a photo-montage of what became of each student post leaving school. Vivienne had remained as music teacher, directing a school play every year since, till, at the year of release of 'this very film', she retires from the job.

Cast
 Minnie Driver as Vivienne
 Aneurin Barnard as Davey
 Owen Teale as Davey's Dad
 Danielle Branch as Stella
 Robert Pugh as Headmaster
 Haydn Gwynne as Mrs Valentine
 Steve Speirs as Mr Cafferty
 Aled Pugh as Tim
 Julia Perez as Sylvie
 Kimberley Nixon as Vicki Munro
 Tom Rhys Harries as Evan 
 Kristian Gwilliam as Hoople/ Andy Dixon
 Kayleigh Bennett as Dena Davies
 Jodie Davis as Mandy
 George MacKay as Jake Zeppi
 Adam Byard as Lewis Munro
 David Garner as Mac
 Gemma Perry as Art Girl

See also
 Musical film

References

External links
 
 

2011 films
Welsh films
British musical drama films
2010s musical drama films
English-language Welsh films
Films shot in Wales
Films set in 1976
Films set in Wales
Films directed by Marc Evans
Variance Films films
2011 drama films
2010s English-language films
2010s British films